is a city located in Gifu, Japan. , the city had an estimated population of 33,283, and a population density of 39 persons per km2 (101/sq mi), in 12,253 households. The city is famous for its hot springs.

Geography
Gero is located in east-central Gifu Prefecture. The Hida River  and the Maze River run throughout the city.  Over 91% of the city area is covered by mountains and forest. Much of the city is within the borders of the Hida-Kisogawa Quasi-National Park. The volcano, Mount Ontake, is located in Gero.

Climate
The city has a climate characterized by hot and humid summers, and mild winters (Köppen climate classification Cfa).

Neighbouring municipalities
Gifu Prefecture
Takayama
Seki
Nakatsugawa
Gujō
Shirakawa
Hichisō
Nagano Prefecture
Kiso
Ōtaki

Demographics
Per Japanese census data, the population of Gero has declined over the past 50 years.

History
The area around Gero was part of traditional Hida Province.  During the Edo period, it was part of the tenryō controlled directly by the Tokugawa shogunate. During the post-Meiji restoration cadastral reforms, the area was organised into Mashita District, Gifu. The village of Gero of created on July 1, 1889 with the establishment of the modern municipalities system. It was raised to town status on January 1, 1925. Gero merged with the towns of Hagiwara, Kanayama and Osaka, and the village of Maze (all from Mashita District) on March 1, 2004 to form the city of Gero.

Government
Gero has a mayor-council form of government with a directly elected mayor and a unicameral city legislature of 14 members.

Economy
Gero's major industry is tourism. It is known throughout Japan for its onsen, which are mentioned even in the Nara period Shoku Nihongi.  Gero has many hotels that can be visited by guests that are looking for accommodations near the hot springs. Large tubs are located in some hotels allowing couples to bathe together. Some hotels lend yukatas to the couples. It's not unusual to see people wearing yukatas on the streets  and even in stores. Besides those in hotels, there are many inexpensive and convenient onsens located near railway stations, residential areas, and commercial centers up and down the valley. Forestry and agriculture also play significant roles in the local economy.

Education
Gero has 13 public elementary schools and six public middle schools operated by the city government, and one public high school operated by the Gifu Prefectural Board of Education. The prefecture also operates two special education schools.

Transportation

Railway

 JR Tōkai  - Takayama Main Line
 -   -  -  -  -  -   -

Highway

Sister city relations

International 
 Ketchikan, Alaska, United States
 Pensacola, Florida, USA
 Salesópolis, São Paulo, Brazil

Domestic 
Ichinomiya, Aichi Prefecture
Hodatsushimizu, Hakui District, Ishikawa Prefecture

References

External links

  
  
 Sister City Exchange Report (JCIE)
 Gero-Onsen Convention Official Site 
 Info Gero Spa (Japanese)

 
Cities in Gifu Prefecture